Posoltega is a municipality in the Chinandega department of Nicaragua.

The town and surrounding area suffered severe damage from Hurricane Mitch in 1998.

International relations

Twin towns – Sister cities
Posoltega is twinned with:

Municipalities of the Chinandega Department